The Augusta Museum of History is a history museum located in Augusta, Georgia, U.S.  The museum was founded in 1937 to preserve and share the history of Augusta and its surrounding area. On display are numerous artifacts, images, and dioramas that showcase the broad spectrum of the region's history. The Museum of History is the only Museum in the CSRA (Central Savannah River Area - includes four counties in Georgia: Burke, Columbia, McDuffie and Richmond and two counties in South Carolina - Aiken and Edgefield) accredited by the American Alliance of Museums.

Permanent Collection

Augusta's Story – This exhibit explores the 12,000-year journey of the region's history.  It is composed of artifacts from the prehistoric times to James Brown, the Godfather of Soul.  Artifacts include a diorama of Stallings Island culture, slave-made pottery from the antebellum era, 12-pounder bronze Napoleon Cannon tube, and an 1869 steam fire engine that shows the destruction of the 1916 fire.  An interactive computer interactive is also a part of the exhibit.  The computer allows visitors to explore the American Revolution.
One Man, Two Ships: Lessens in History and Courage – Learn about the inspiring life of Aquilla James Dyess! As the only person in history to ever receive both the Carnegie Medal and the Medal of Honor, his life and accomplishments are detailed in this exhibit. Honor this extraordinary Augustan and learn about both the man and his enduring legacy.  Also information about the USS Dyess and USS Augusta.
WBBQ – This exhibit showcases one of Augusta's most popular radio station.  The most recent addition to the exhibit is the WBBQ: Then and Now section.  This was installed in commemoration of the radio station's 60th Anniversary.  It shows the history and the innovation that makes WBBQ treasured by the population in Augusta.  This exhibit is located in the Museum History Theater on the second floor of the museum.
Georgia Railroad and Banking Company – This exhibit is called Into the Interior: A History of the Georgia Railroad and Banking Company.  It is located in the Knox Foundation Center for the Preservation and Study of the Central Savannah River Area.  The exhibit presents artifacts that recount the history of the company over a span of 153 years. Railroad maps, a locomotive bell, and stock books are just a few of the numerous objects that are located in the exhibit.  The Georgia Railroad and Banking Company was amended in 1835 and is the most important company in Augusta and in the state of Georgia.
Local Legends –  This exhibition is a celebration of the incredible talent of area-wide entertainers, musicians, singers, authors, athletes, journalists, and other notable personalities.  Telling and sharing their stories with the public is the purpose of this exhibition.
The Transportation Corridor – This is a showcase of the transportation that the region has had over the past 150 years.  There is a wide variety of vehicles that are shown in this exhibit.  A few vehicles are a 1900 Farm Wagon, a 1917 Steam Locomotive, and a 1952 Dodge Power Wagon.  Also placed in the exhibit is a reconstructed 1930s Gas Station.

Exhibitions

The Godfather of Soul, Mr. James Brown – An exhibition of this kind has never been created before.  This exhibit recounts the life of James Brown and highlights the events that led to his global fame.  It shows artifacts and costumes from many different decades that were worn by Brown in his performances.  One of the more specific artifacts is the ‘King of Soul’ crown that he wore in the 1950s.  New additions to the exhibit are the programs of the James Brown Memorial Services.  These programs are from the memorial services held in New York City, Augusta, and South Carolina.  Kiosks add interactive features to the exhibit for more enjoyment by the visitors.
Celebrating a Grand Tradition, the Sport of Golf  – explores how the sport has evolved over the centuries, the technological advances of tees, balls, clubs, and accessories, as well as the rich history of golf in the Augusta region, and no exhibit on golf would be complete without presenting the people that have made this game so special for so many. >
A Community That Heals – This exhibit chronicles the 200 years of Augusta's medical history.  The first hospital was established in 1818 and was located on the 100 block of Greene Street.  This hospital was also the first place that the Medical College of Georgia was located.

Location and Information
The museum is located at 560 Reynolds Street in downtown Augusta. It is open Thursday through Saturday from 10:00 a.m. to 5:00 p.m. On Sunday, it is open from 1:00 p.m. to 5:00 p.m. It is closed every major on holidays. Groups of ten (10) or more may book in advance admission to the museum any day of the week.

References

External links
Augusta Museum of History - official site

History museums in Georgia (U.S. state)
Museums in Augusta, Georgia
Institutions accredited by the American Alliance of Museums